William "Ollie" McKelson (13 August 1881 – 5 December 1950) was an Australian rules footballer who played a single game with South Melbourne in the Victorian Football League (VFL).

Notes

External links 

1881 births
1950 deaths
Australian rules footballers from Victoria (Australia)
Sydney Swans players